Sayyid Hassan Emami (1903–1981) was an Iranian Shia cleric and royalist politician. He worked as a judge in the Ministry of Justice and taught law at the University of Tehran.

He was regarded as a member of the Mohammad Reza Shah's inner circle, and had close ties to bazaari and traditional classes, as well as Masonic lodges. He supported Reza Shah's secular reforms, despite his family's history of religious conservatism. Emami is described an Anglophile politician and staunchly hostile to Mohammad Mossadegh and his policies. He discarded his religious attire after he returned from Switzerland, where he studied continental law, but resumed wearing it when he was appointed as Tehran's Friday prayer imam in 1947.

In 1952 Iranian legislative election, Emami stood as a candidate from Kurdish and Sunni city of Mahabad, where he had never been. He was elected with the interference by Artesh, thus Mohammad Mossadegh asked the parliament to reject his credentials but he was affirmed. On 1 July 1952, he defeated the National Front-backed Abdullah Moazzami for the Speaker of the Parliament of Iran. Emami fled the country following the 21 July pro-Mohammad Mossadegh demonstrations and offered his resignation in a message from Geneva.

References

Bibliography
 Ḥoqūq-e madanī (Civic Jurisprudence; 6 vols., Tehran, 1335-42 Š./1956-63)

External links

1903 births
1981 deaths
20th-century Iranian judges
Academic staff of the University of Tehran
Emami
Speakers of the National Consultative Assembly
Exiles of the Iranian Revolution in Switzerland
Iranian monarchists
University of Lausanne alumni
Iranian Shia clerics
Politicians from Tehran